is a former Japanese football player.

Playing career
Ito was born in Osaka Prefecture on May 28, 1978. After graduating from high school, he joined Regional Leagues club Nagoya SC in 1997. In 1999, he moved to newly was promoted to J2 League club, Ventforet Kofu. Although he could not play at all in the match behind Takehisa Sakamoto, he became a regular goalkeeper from late 1999. However the club finished at bottom place for 2 years in a row (1999-2000). In 2001, he moved to J2 club Shonan Bellmare. However he could hardly play in the match behind Yuji Ito and Masahito Suzuki. In 2003, he moved to J1 club Cerezo Osaka. However he could not play at all in the match behind Seigo Shimokawa and Daisuke Tada in 2003. In 2004, he played many matches as regular goalkeeper. However he could hardly play in the match behind new member Motohiro Yoshida in 2005. In 2006, he moved to J2 club Shonan Bellmare for the first time in 4 years. Although he played many matches as regular goalkeeper in 2006, he could not play at all in the match behind newcomer Kim Yeong-gi from 2007 and retired end of 2009 season. However he came back as player in 2010 because many goalkeeper got hurt. However he did not play the match and retired end of 2010 season.

Club statistics

References

External links

1978 births
Living people
Association football people from Osaka Prefecture
Japanese footballers
J1 League players
J2 League players
Nagoya SC players
Ventforet Kofu players
Shonan Bellmare players
Cerezo Osaka players
Association football goalkeepers